Iwona Elżbieta Śledzińska-Katarasińska (born 3 January 1941 in Komorniki) is a Polish politician. She was elected to the Sejm on 25 September 2005, getting 23,119 votes in 9 Łódź district as a candidate from the Civic Platform list.

In People's Republic of Poland she was a journalist of  "Głos Robotniczy" press organ of Polish United Workers' Party in Łódź. Inspired by communists during 1968 Polish political crisis she has written many anti-Semitic texts.

She has been a member of the Polish Sejm since 1991, being the only member continuously serving all terms since the fall of Communism in Poland. She has served all of her 9 terms from her home constituency of Łódź.

See also
Members of Polish Sejm 1997-2001
Members of Polish Sejm 2005-2007
Members of Polish Sejm 2007-2011

References

External links
Iwona Śledzińska-Katarasińska - parliamentary page - includes declarations of interest, voting record, and transcripts of speeches.

Members of the Polish Sejm 1991–1993
Members of the Polish Sejm 1993–1997
Members of the Polish Sejm 1997–2001
Members of the Polish Sejm 2001–2005
Members of the Polish Sejm 2005–2007
Members of the Polish Sejm 2007–2011
Members of the Polish Sejm 2011–2015
Members of the Polish Sejm 2015–2019
Members of the Polish Sejm 2019–2023
Women members of the Sejm of the Republic of Poland
Civic Platform politicians
1941 births
Living people
20th-century Polish women politicians
21st-century Polish women politicians